Pachu  may refer to:

People
 Pachu Ojeda (born 1991), Spanish woman footballer
 Pachu Peña (born 1962), Argentine comedian and actor
 Pachu (footballer, born 1986), Equatoguinean woman footballer Maricruz Mangue Oburu Nchama
 Pachu (footballer, born 1996), Brazilian football forward Luiz Henrique Pachu Lira

Places
 Pachu, Bhutan, a town